A nuclear power plant (NPP) is a thermal power station in which the heat source is a nuclear reactor. As is typical of thermal power stations, heat is used to generate steam that drives a steam turbine connected to a generator that produces electricity. , the International Atomic Energy Agency reported there were 422 nuclear power reactors in operation in 32 countries around the world, and 57 nuclear power reactors under construction.

Nuclear plants are very often used for base load since their operations, maintenance, and fuel costs are at the lower end of the spectrum of costs. However, building a nuclear power plant often spans five to ten years, which can accrue to significant financial costs, depending on how the initial investments are financed.

Nuclear power plants have a carbon footprint comparable to that of renewable energy such as solar farms and wind farms, and much lower than fossil fuels such as natural gas and brown coal. Despite some spectacular catastrophes, nuclear power plants are among the safest mode of electricity generation, comparable to solar and wind power plants.

History 

The first time that heat from a nuclear reactor was used to generate electricity was on December 21, 1951 at the Experimental Breeder Reactor I, feeding four light bulbs.

On June 27, 1954, the world's first nuclear power station to generate electricity for a power grid, the Obninsk Nuclear Power Plant, commenced operations in Obninsk, in the Soviet Union.
The world's first full scale power station, Calder Hall in the United Kingdom, opened on October 17, 1956. The world's first full scale power station solely devoted to electricity production—Calder Hall was also meant to produce plutonium—the Shippingport Atomic Power Station in Pennsylvania, United States—was connected to the grid on December 18, 1957.

Basic components 

 Fuel handling
 Radwaste system
 Refueling floor
 Spent fuel pool
 Online refueling machine(s) in some designs such as RBMK and CANDU

 Power generation
 Condenser
 Cooling tower
 Electrical generator
 Steam turbine

 Reactor assembly
 Control rod drives 
 Instrumentation such as ion chambers
 Control rods
 Coolant
 Neutron howitzer
 Neutron moderator
 Neutron poison
 Nuclear fuel
 Nuclear reactor core
 Reactor pressure vessel (In most reactors)
 Startup neutron source

 Safety systems
 Containment building
 Emergency core cooling system
 Emergency power system
 Essential service water system
 Reactor protection system
 Standby liquid control system

 Steam generation
 Boiler feedwater pump
 Steam generators (in PWR reactors, which also have pressurizers)

Systems 

The conversion to electrical energy takes place indirectly, as in conventional thermal power stations. The fission in a nuclear reactor heats the reactor coolant. The coolant may be water or gas, or even liquid metal, depending on the type of reactor. The reactor coolant then goes to a steam generator and heats water to produce steam. The pressurized steam is then usually fed to a multi-stage steam turbine. After the steam turbine has expanded and partially condensed the steam, the remaining vapor is condensed in a condenser. The condenser is a heat exchanger which is connected to a secondary side such as a river or a cooling tower. The water is then pumped back into the steam generator and the cycle begins again. The water-steam cycle corresponds to the Rankine cycle.

The nuclear reactor is the heart of the station. In its central part, the reactor's core produces heat due to nuclear fission. With this heat, a coolant is heated as it is pumped through the reactor and thereby removes the energy from the reactor. The heat from nuclear fission is used to raise steam, which runs through turbines, which in turn power the electrical generators.

Nuclear reactors usually rely on uranium to fuel the chain reaction. Uranium is a very heavy metal that is abundant on Earth and is found in sea water as well as most rocks. Naturally occurring uranium is found in two different isotopes: uranium-238 (U-238), accounting for 99.3% and uranium-235 (U-235) accounting for about 0.7%. U-238 has 146 neutrons and U-235 has 143 neutrons.

Different isotopes have different behaviors. For instance, U-235 is fissile which means that it is easily split and gives off a lot of energy making it ideal for nuclear energy. On the other hand, U-238 does not have that property despite it being the same element. Different isotopes also have different half-lives. U-238 has a longer half-life than U-235, so it takes longer to decay over time. This also means that U-238 is less radioactive than U-235.

Since nuclear fission creates radioactivity, the reactor core is surrounded by a protective shield. This containment absorbs radiation and prevents radioactive material from being released into the environment. In addition, many reactors are equipped with a dome of concrete to protect the reactor against both internal casualties and external impacts.

The purpose of the steam turbine is to convert the heat contained in steam into mechanical energy. The engine house with the steam turbine is usually structurally separated from the main reactor building. It is aligned so as to prevent debris from the destruction of a turbine in operation from flying towards the reactor.

In the case of a pressurized water reactor, the steam turbine is separated from the nuclear system. To detect a leak in the steam generator and thus the passage of radioactive water at an early stage, an activity meter is mounted to track the outlet steam of the steam generator. In contrast, boiling water reactors pass radioactive water through the steam turbine, so the turbine is kept as part of the radiologically controlled area of the nuclear power station.

The electric generator converts mechanical power supplied by the turbine into electrical power. Low-pole AC synchronous generators of high rated power are used. A cooling system removes heat from the reactor core and transports it to another area of the station, where the thermal energy can be harnessed to produce electricity or to do other useful work. Typically the hot coolant is used as a heat source for a boiler, and the pressurized steam from that drives one or more steam turbine driven electrical generators.

In the event of an emergency, safety valves can be used to prevent pipes from bursting or the reactor from exploding. The valves are designed so that they can derive all of the supplied flow rates with little increase in pressure. In the case of the BWR, the steam is directed into the suppression chamber and condenses there. The chambers on a heat exchanger are connected to the intermediate cooling circuit.

The main condenser is a large cross-flow shell and tube heat exchanger that takes wet vapor, a mixture of liquid water and steam at saturation conditions, from the turbine-generator exhaust and condenses it back into sub-cooled liquid water so it can be pumped back to the reactor by the condensate and feedwater pumps.

In the main condenser, the wet vapor turbine exhaust come into contact with thousands of tubes that have much colder water flowing through them on the other side. The cooling water typically come from a natural body of water such as a river or lake. 
The water coming from the cooling body of water is either pumped back to the water source at a warmer temperature or returns to a cooling tower where it either cools for more uses or evaporates into water vapor that rises out the top of the tower.

The water level in the steam generator and the nuclear reactor is controlled using the feedwater system. The feedwater pump has the task of taking the water from the condensate system, increasing the pressure and forcing it into either the steam generators—in the case of a pressurized water reactor — or directly into the reactor, for boiling water reactors.

Continuous power supply to the plant is critical to ensure safe operation. Most nuclear stations require at least two distinct sources of offsite power for redundancy. These are usually provided by multiple transformers that are sufficiently separated and can receive power from multiple transmission lines. In addition, in some nuclear stations, the turbine generator can power the station's loads while the station is online, without requiring external power. This is achieved via station service transformers which tap power from the generator output before they reach the step-up transformer.

Economics 

The economics of nuclear power plants is a controversial subject, and multibillion-dollar investments ride on the choice of an energy source. Nuclear power stations typically have high capital costs, but low direct fuel costs, with the costs of fuel extraction, processing, use and spent fuel storage internalized costs. Therefore, comparison with other power generation methods is strongly dependent on assumptions about construction timescales and capital financing for nuclear stations. Cost estimates take into account station decommissioning and nuclear waste storage or recycling costs in the United States due to the Price Anderson Act.

With the prospect that all spent nuclear fuel could potentially be recycled by using future reactors, generation IV reactors are being designed to completely close the nuclear fuel cycle. However, up to now, there has not been any actual bulk recycling of waste from a NPP, and on-site temporary storage is still being used at almost all plant sites due to construction problems for deep geological repositories. Only Finland has stable repository plans, therefore from a worldwide perspective, long-term waste storage costs are uncertain.

Construction, or capital cost aside, measures to mitigate global warming such as a carbon tax or carbon emissions trading, increasingly favor the economics of nuclear power. Further efficiencies are hoped to be achieved through more advanced reactor designs, Generation III reactors promise to be at least 17% more fuel efficient, and have lower capital costs, while Generation IV reactors promise further gains in fuel efficiency and significant reductions in nuclear waste.

In Eastern Europe, a number of long-established projects are struggling to find financing, notably Belene in Bulgaria and the additional reactors at Cernavodă in Romania, and some potential backers have pulled out. Where cheap gas is available and its future supply relatively secure, this also poses a major problem for nuclear projects.

Analysis of the economics of nuclear power must take into account who bears the risks of future uncertainties. To date all operating nuclear power stations were developed by state-owned or regulated utilities where many of the risks associated with construction costs, operating performance, fuel price, and other factors were borne by consumers rather than suppliers. Many countries have now liberalized the electricity market where these risks and the risk of cheaper competitors emerging before capital costs are recovered, are borne by station suppliers and operators rather than consumers, which leads to a significantly different evaluation of the economics of new nuclear power stations.

Following the 2011 Fukushima nuclear accident in Japan, costs are likely to go up for currently operating and new nuclear power stations, due to increased requirements for on-site spent fuel management and elevated design basis threats. However many designs, such as the currently under construction AP1000, use passive nuclear safety cooling systems, unlike those of Fukushima I which required active cooling systems, which largely eliminates the need to spend more on redundant back up safety equipment.

According to the World Nuclear Association, as of March 2020:

 Nuclear power is cost competitive with other forms of electricity generation, except where there is direct access to low-cost fossil fuels.
 Fuel costs for nuclear plants are a minor proportion of total generating costs, though capital costs are greater than those for coal-fired plants and much greater than those for gas-fired plants.
 System costs for nuclear power (as well as coal and gas-fired generation) are very much lower than for intermittent renewables.
 Providing incentives for long-term, high-capital investment in deregulated markets driven by short-term price signals presents a challenge in securing a diversified and reliable electricity supply system.
 In assessing the economics of nuclear power, decommissioning and waste disposal costs are fully taken into account.
 Nuclear power plant construction is typical of large infrastructure projects around the world, whose costs and delivery challenges tend to be under-estimated.

Safety and accidents 

Modern nuclear reactor designs have had numerous safety improvements since the first-generation nuclear reactors. A nuclear power plant cannot explode like a nuclear weapon because the fuel for uranium reactors is not enriched enough, and nuclear weapons require precision explosives to force fuel into a small enough volume to go supercritical. Most reactors require continuous temperature control to prevent a core meltdown, which has occurred on a few occasions through accident or natural disaster, releasing radiation and making the surrounding area uninhabitable. Plants must be defended against theft of nuclear material and attack by enemy military planes or missiles.

The most serious accidents to date have been the 1979 Three Mile Island accident, the 1986 Chernobyl disaster, and the 2011 Fukushima Daiichi nuclear disaster, corresponding to the beginning of the operation of generation II reactors.

Professor of sociology Charles Perrow states that multiple and unexpected failures are built into society's complex and tightly-coupled nuclear reactor systems. Such accidents are unavoidable and cannot be designed around. An interdisciplinary team from MIT has estimated that given the expected growth of nuclear power from 2005 to 2055, at least four serious nuclear accidents would be expected in that period. The MIT study does not take into account improvements in safety since 1970.

Controversy
 
The nuclear power debate about the deployment and use of nuclear fission reactors to generate electricity from nuclear fuel for civilian purposes peaked during the 1970s and 1980s, when it "reached an intensity unprecedented in the history of technology controversies," in some countries.

Proponents argue that nuclear power is a sustainable energy source which reduces carbon emissions and can increase energy security if its use supplants a dependence on imported fuels. Proponents advance the notion that nuclear power produces virtually no air pollution, in contrast to the chief viable alternative of fossil fuel. Proponents also believe that nuclear power is the only viable course to achieve energy independence for most Western countries. They emphasize that the risks of storing waste are small and can be further reduced by using the latest technology in newer reactors, and the operational safety record in the Western world is excellent when compared to the other major kinds of power plants.

Opponents say that nuclear power poses many threats to people and the environment, and that costs do not justify benefits. Threats include health risks and environmental damage from uranium mining, processing and transport, the risk of nuclear weapons proliferation or sabotage, and the problem of radioactive nuclear waste. Another environmental issue is discharge of hot water into the sea. The hot water modifies the environmental conditions for marine flora and fauna. They also contend that reactors themselves are enormously complex machines where many things can and do go wrong, and there have been many serious nuclear accidents. Critics do not believe that these risks can be reduced through new technology, despite rapid advancements in containment procedures and storage methods.

Opponents argue that when all the energy-intensive stages of the nuclear fuel chain are considered, from uranium mining to nuclear decommissioning, nuclear power is not a low-carbon electricity source despite the possibility of refinement and long term storage being powered by a nuclear facility. Those countries that do not contain uranium mines cannot achieve energy independence through existing nuclear power technologies. Actual construction costs often exceed estimates, and spent fuel management costs are difficult to define.

On 1 August 2020, the UAE launched the Arab region's first-ever nuclear energy plant. Unit 1 of the Barakah plant in the Al Dhafrah region of Abu Dhabi commenced generating heat on the first day of its launch, while the remaining 3 Units are being built. However, Nuclear Consulting Group head, Paul Dorfman, warned the Gulf nation's investment into the plant as a risk "further destabilizing the volatile Gulf region, damaging the environment and raising the possibility of nuclear proliferation."

Reprocessing 
Nuclear reprocessing technology was developed to chemically separate and recover fissionable plutonium from irradiated nuclear fuel. Reprocessing serves multiple purposes, whose relative importance has changed over time. Originally reprocessing was used solely to extract plutonium for producing nuclear weapons. With the commercialization of nuclear power, the reprocessed plutonium was recycled back into MOX nuclear fuel for thermal reactors. The reprocessed uranium, which constitutes the bulk of the spent fuel material, can in principle also be re-used as fuel, but that is only economic when uranium prices are high or disposal is expensive. Finally, the breeder reactor can employ not only the recycled plutonium and uranium in spent fuel, but all the actinides, closing the nuclear fuel cycle and potentially multiplying the energy extracted from natural uranium by more than 60 times.

Nuclear reprocessing reduces the volume of high-level waste, but by itself does not reduce radioactivity or heat generation and therefore does not eliminate the need for a geological waste repository. Reprocessing has been politically controversial because of the potential to contribute to nuclear proliferation, the potential vulnerability to nuclear terrorism, the political challenges of repository siting (a problem that applies equally to direct disposal of spent fuel), and because of its high cost compared to the once-through fuel cycle. In the United States, the Obama administration stepped back from President Bush's plans for commercial-scale reprocessing and reverted to a program focused on reprocessing-related scientific research.

Accident indemnification
Nuclear power works under an insurance framework that limits or structures accident liabilities in accordance with the Paris Convention on Third Party Liability in the Field of Nuclear Energy, the Brussels supplementary convention, and the Vienna Convention on Civil Liability for Nuclear Damage.
However states with a majority of the world's nuclear power stations, including the U.S., Russia, China and Japan, are not party to international nuclear liability conventions. 

United States In the United States, insurance for nuclear or radiological incidents is covered (for facilities licensed through 2025) by the Price-Anderson Nuclear Industries Indemnity Act.

United Kingdom Under the energy policy of the United Kingdom through its 1965 Nuclear Installations Act, liability is governed for nuclear damage for which a UK nuclear licensee is responsible. The Act requires compensation to be paid for damage up to a limit of £150 million by the liable operator for ten years after the incident. Between ten and thirty years afterwards, the Government meets this obligation. The Government is also liable for additional limited cross-border liability (about £300 million) under international conventions (Paris Convention on Third Party Liability in the Field of Nuclear Energy and Brussels Convention supplementary to the Paris Convention).

Decommissioning 
Nuclear decommissioning is the dismantling of a nuclear power station and decontamination of the site to a state no longer requiring protection from radiation for the general public. The main difference from the dismantling of other power stations is the presence of radioactive material that requires special precautions to remove and safely relocate to a waste repository.

Decommissioning involves many administrative and technical actions. It includes all clean-up of radioactivity and progressive demolition of the station. Once a facility is decommissioned, there should no longer be any danger of a radioactive accident or to any persons visiting it. After a facility has been completely decommissioned it is released from regulatory control, and the licensee of the station no longer has responsibility for its nuclear safety.

Timing and deferral of decommissioning 
Generally speaking, nuclear stations were originally designed for a life of about 30 years. Newer stations are designed for a 40 to 60-year operating life. The Centurion Reactor is a future class of nuclear reactor that is being designed to last 100 years. 

One of the major limiting wear factors is the deterioration of the reactor's pressure vessel under the action of neutron bombardment, however in 2018 Rosatom announced it had developed a thermal annealing technique for reactor pressure vessels which ameliorates radiation damage and extends service life by between 15 and 30 years.

Flexibility 
Nuclear stations are used primarily for base load because of economic considerations. The fuel cost of operations for a nuclear station is smaller than the fuel cost for operation of coal or gas plants. Since most of the cost of nuclear power plant is capital cost, there is almost no cost saving by running it at less than full capacity.

Nuclear power plants are routinely used in load following mode on a large scale in France, although "it is generally accepted that this is not an ideal economic situation for nuclear stations." Unit A at the decommissioned German Biblis Nuclear Power Plant was designed to modulate its output 15% per minute between 40% to 100% of its nominal power.

Russia has led in the practical development of floating nuclear power stations, which can be transported to the desired location and occasionally relocated or moved for easier decommissioning. In 2022, the United States Department of Energy funded a three-year research study of offshore floating nuclear power generation. In October 2022, NuScale Power and Canadian company Prodigy announced a joint project to bring a North American small modular reactor based floating plant to market.

See also

Footnotes

External links 
 
 Non Destructive Testing for Nuclear Power Plants
 Glossary of Nuclear Terms